Moominvalley is the soundtrack to the animated family drama series Moominvalley. In September 2018, it was announced that Gutsy Animations made a deal with Sony Music to have the label's artists contribute original songs for each episode. The track listing for the soundtrack was revealed on 25 January 2019. Danish singer Mø sings the theme song "I'm Far Away" for the series. The series includes tracks from artists such as Tom Odell, First Aid Kit, and Alma. The theme song and "Starlight" by Alma were released from the soundtrack on February 22, 2019. "Summer Day" by Tom Odell was released on April 5, 2019. The soundtrack was released on April 19, 2019 through Columbia Records.

Track listing

Charts

References 

2019 soundtrack albums
Television animation soundtracks
Columbia Records soundtracks
Moomin television series